Brookhampton is a hamlet in the village and civil parish of Stadhampton,  north of Wallingford, in South Oxfordshire, England.

Hamlets in Oxfordshire